Mahonia gracilipes is a shrub in the family Berberidaceae, first described in 1887. It is endemic to China, native to the Sichuan and Yunnan Provinces.

References

gracilipes
Endemic flora of China
Plants described in 1887